Mahendragiri is the name of a hill in Tirunelveli District, South Tamil Nadu.

The ISRO Propulsion Complex, a test facility for Indian Space Research Organisation's launch vehicle and satellite propulsion systems, is situated on the lower slopes of this mountain.

Citations

References
 

Mountains of the Western Ghats
Ancient Indian mountains
Tirunelveli
Hills of Tamil Nadu